Croatia is a nation that has competed at three Hopman Cup tournaments since it gained its independence following the breakup of Yugoslavia in the early 1990s. It first competed in the Hopman Cup in 1996 and went on to win the title that year, its best showing at the tournament to date.

Players
This is a list of players who have played for Croatia in the Hopman Cup.

Results

1 In the 1996 final, it came down to the mixed doubles to decide the tournament champions. The Swiss team were forced to retire with the score at 5–5 in the final set when Marc Rosset injured his hand after punching an advertising board in anger.

References

See also
Yugoslavia at the Hopman Cup

Hopman Cup teams
Hopman Cup